Saint-Jean-de-la-Ruelle is a commune in the Loiret department in the  administrative region of Centre-Val de Loire, France.

Populations

Personalities
 Dosseh, rapper and actor
 Stéphane Kakou, footballer

Twin towns – sister cities

Saint-Jean-de-la-Ruelle is twinned with:
 Amposta, Spain
 Gommern, Germany
 Niepołomice, Poland

See also
 Communes of the Loiret department

References

Saintjeandelaruelle
Loiret communes articles needing translation from French Wikipedia